Matías Albarracín (born 25 October 1979) is an Argentine Olympic show jumping rider. He competed at the 2016 Summer Olympics in Rio de Janeiro where he finished 8th in the individual and 10th in the team competition.

Albarracin also participated at four Pan American Games (in 2007, 2011, 2015 and 2019). His biggest success came in 2015 when he won a team silver.

He competed at the 2020 Summer Olympics.

References

External links

Living people
1979 births
Argentine male equestrians
Equestrians at the 2016 Summer Olympics
Olympic equestrians of Argentina
Equestrians at the 2007 Pan American Games
Equestrians at the 2011 Pan American Games
Equestrians at the 2015 Pan American Games
Equestrians at the 2019 Pan American Games
Pan American Games silver medalists for Argentina
Pan American Games medalists in equestrian
Medalists at the 2015 Pan American Games
Equestrians at the 2020 Summer Olympics